The 1980 Invercargill mayoral election was part of the New Zealand local elections held that same year. The polling was conducted using the standard first-past-the-post electoral method. In the toughest challenge of his mayoralty, the incumbent F. Russell Miller defeated deputy mayor Eve Poole.

Results
The following table gives the election results:

References

1980 elections in New Zealand
Mayoral elections in Invercargill
October 1980 events in New Zealand